Haruniyeh Dome (or simply Haruniyeh) is a historical monument in Tus, northeast Iran. 

Haruniyeh Dome is the oldest monument left in the city. This historic site is located about 600 meters from the tomb of Ferdowsi, famous Iranian poet. It is exclusively a monastery or tomb that was built on the ruins of Tabran in the fifteenth century. Tabran was a section of Tus which does not exist today.

Next to this building a black stone as the memorial of Al-Ghazali, one of the Iranian mystics of the 13th century. Haruniyeh was built on the Early Post Islamic Iranian of architecture. It is among the historical sites recorded by the Iranian Cultural Heritage Organization.

Gallery

References

Buildings and structures in Razavi Khorasan Province
Domes
Tourist attractions in Razavi Khorasan Province